A list of films produced in Mexico in 1960 (see 1960 in film):

1960

See also
 1960 in film
 1960 in Mexico

External links

1960
Films
Mexican